Varmint rifle is an American English term for a small-caliber precision firearm or high-powered airgun primarily used for both varmint hunting (the elimination of outdoor animals which harass properties) and pest control (the eradication of indoor infestation by destructive species).  These tasks include killing three types of pests or nuisance animals that spread diseases or destroy crops or livestock:
 Small/medium-sized non-game animals such as crows, ground squirrels, jackrabbits, nutria, marmots, groundhogs, porcupines, opossums, skunks and weasels;
 Non-native feral/invasive species such as starlings, cats, dogs, goats, wild boar/pigs and donkeys;
 Animals considered to be nuisance vermin destructive to man-made properties and vegetation, crops and domestic livestocks, such as rats, house sparrows, gophers, and small predators such as coyotes and jackals.

Varmint guns fill a design gap between the more powerful big game rifles and the less powerful rimfire firearms. 
Big game rifles are more suitable for stalking and taking down individual large-sized animals such as reindeer, elk and buffalo at medium ranges, but not adequate for frequent repeated firing.  Rimfire firearms (such as the highly popular .22 LR caliber) are best used to shoot small vermin such as squirrels and rats at close distances, and are somewhat underpowered for many outdoor rodents (which are often alert enough to spot hunters from a long distance away and flee or hide underground), small predators such as coyotes and larger feral animals such as goats and pigs.  The varmint rifles are very suitable for repeated medium/long-range shots from a fixed firing position, thus fulfilling and overlapping the functional demands with both in terms of hunting applications.

Common design elements
While any rifle of sufficient power can be used to dispatch targets of opportunity (the venerable .30-30 Winchester lever action and the Ruger Mini-14 are common truck guns or ranch guns kept handy for this) the deliberate taking of varmints requires special characteristics more common to target rifles than "normal" hunting rifles.

General characteristics

Varmint rifles can typically be distinguished from other light-caliber hunting or plinking rifles in the use of heavier barrels and (often) omission of open sights. Use of magnifying optics allows for more accurate fire (often on very small, distant targets). Barrels will generally be free-floated, and other accurizing techniques will be performed, either by the manufacturer or the owner. The stocks will generally have wider forends, designed for use on stable sandbag rests, and high combs for easy use with optics.

Since part of the definition of a "varmint" is that it is a nuisance, varmints are not stalked, but rather they are hunted from a fixed position. This makes weight of little consideration in a varmint rifle, so heavy barrels are common. Varmints are also not subject to the same bag limits as game animals are, so far more shots may be fired. The heavier barrel is, in general, more accurate than a light barrel, plus the extra mass helps reduce the felt recoil and absorb the heat from more shots before expanding and potentially reducing accuracy. Folding shooting benches and sandbag rests help provide a stable base for the shooter, allowing the maximum accuracy to be extracted from the rifle.

Calibers
 
Since varmints are generally smaller animals, large, heavy bullets are not needed. A light, fast bullet gives a flat trajectory, making range estimation less vital for accurate shot placement. Velocities for modern varmint rounds are usually in excess of   such as the .223 Remington and some like the .220 Swift can exceed . This allows long range shots with a short time of flight, and little change in trajectory at different ranges (see external ballistics). A bullet drop of only a couple of inches (about 5 cm) is enough to cause a miss on smaller varmint animals; so flat trajectories increase hit probability at long ranges. Fast, lightly constructed bullets have additional advantages of rapidly disintegrating upon initial contact. Disintegration minimizes the range of ricochet particles; and energy release of disintegration kills small animals more quickly than a penetrating wound.

Varmint shooting is one of the few areas where calibers smaller than .22 (5.56 mm) are found; the .17 Remington and various other .17 caliber (4.5 mm) wildcats have a vocal following, and the new .204 Ruger is well suited to varminting, and may be the first in a new line of .20 caliber (5mm) rounds.

For shorter ranges (less than about ) rimfire cartridges such as .22 Magnum and .17 Hornady Magnum Rimfire are popular. The .22 Long Rifle will also do, but the low muzzle velocities result in a supersonic to subsonic transition on the way to the target, which can negatively affect accuracy.

Varmint cartridges

.22 Savage Hi-Power was introduced by Savage Arms in 1912 by necking down the .25-35 Winchester case to fire a  bullet. The .22 Marcianti Blue Streak was a wildcat modification; but the following cartridges fired more popular  bullets.
.22 Hornet became the first commercially successful varmint cartridge in the Winchester Model 54 of 1930. It remains a popular cartridge because of the relatively low noise created by its small powder volume.
.22 Lindahl Chuckers were ballistically similar wildcats developed by Leslie Lindahl from the rimmed .219 Zipper and the rimless .25 Remington.
.218 Bee is a necked-down .25-20 Winchester introduced in the Winchester Repeating Arms Model 65 of 1938. This lever-action rifle was not well received by varmint hunters, and the cartridge has remained relatively unpopular.
.219 Zipper is a necked-down .25-35 Winchester introduced in the Winchester Model 64 of 1937. This lever-action rifle was not well received by varmint hunters, but the cartridge and wildcat modifications (like the .219 Donaldson Wasp) became popular in other actions.
The .220 Arrow is a wildcat modification of the .220 Swift.
.221 Remington Fireball is a shortened version of the .222 Remington introduced in the Remington XP-100 bolt-action handgun (sometimes called a hand rifle) in 1962. The cartridge has attained some popularity in conventional rifles where low noise level is a consideration.
.222 Remington was a new cartridge (resembling a 3/4 scale version of the .30-06 Springfield) introduced commercially in 1950. It enjoyed great popularity until eclipsed by its military derivative, the .223 Remington.
.222 Remington Magnum was a lengthened version of the .222 Remington introduced in 1958. It was never as popular as the .222 Remington, and has subsequently been replaced by the very similar .223 Remington.
.223 Remington became available in 1964 as the civilian version of the 5.56×45mm NATO, and has become one of the most popular cartridges in use today. It is currently used in a wide range of semi-automatic and manual action rifles and even handguns; such as the Colt AR-15, Ruger Mini-14, Remington Model 700, and Remington XP-100. Popularity of the .223 Remington virtually eliminated production of rifles chambered for the similar .222 Remington and .222 Remington Magnum.
.224 Weatherby Magnum was introduced in 1963 as a replacement for Weatherby's .220 Swift wildcat .220 Weatherby Rocket. Only Weatherby rifles have been commercially chambered for this cartridge.
.225 Winchester was a commercial modification of the .219 Zipper offered in the Winchester Model 70 from 1964 to 1971. The cartridge was unsuccessful in replacing the ballistically similar .220 Swift in the Winchester product line.
.22-250 was a wildcat developed in 1937 by J.E. Gebby from the .250-3000 Savage and commercially loaded by Remington Arms in 1964.
.22/3000 Lovell was a wildcat developed by Hervey Lovell from the old .25-20 single shot case (different from .25-20 Winchester). Popularity of Lovell's cartridges declined when manufacture of .25-20 single-shot cartridges ceased.
.22-4000 Schnerring-Sedgley was a wildcat developed by Frankford Arsenal Proof House Foreman George Schnerring by necking down a 7mm Mauser.
.303/22 was a wildcat developed from the .303 British in Canada and Australia during the 1930s.

Action types
Bolt-action rifles dominate the class, with a few specialized AR-15 variants (often referred to as "modern sporting rifles") and single-shot rifles making up the rest. Most bolt-action rifles, if accurized, can be successfully used for varmint hunting. While nearly all varmint guns are rifles, there are a few pistols, generally single shot and bolt-action pistols in rifle calibers such as those developed for metallic silhouette shooting, that have sufficient accuracy, range, and trajectory to allow them to be used for varmint shooting. The Remington XP-100 bolt-action pistol and its aptly named .221 Fireball cartridge, introduced in 1963, were developed for varmint hunting; the full name is the "Model XP-100 Varmint Special".

For varmint and pest control in urban areas, air guns make suitable choices. While the limited power of an air rifle (generally far less than a .22 Long Rifle) limits its usefulness to small rodents at very short range, the limited penetration and low noise allows them to be used in areas where use of firearms is impractical. The popular air gun sport of field target is based on small game and varmint shooting, with targets often shaped like rabbits, squirrels, and other suitable small varmints. The low velocities of air gun pellets makes accurate range estimation paramount, so high magnification telescopic sights are used, with calibrated focus knobs that serve to estimate the range.

See also
Poacher's gun, a type of varmint rifle that can be disassembled for concealment

References

External links
 Sporting Shooters Association of Australia
 Chuck Hawks Article
 The Modern Varmint Rifle by Craig Boddington
 Petersen's Hunting

Rifles
Hunting in the United States